JDiff is a Javadoc doclet which generates an HTML report of all the packages, classes, constructors, methods, and fields which have been removed, added or changed in any way, including their documentation, when two Java APIs are compared. This is very useful for describing exactly what has changed between two releases of a product. Only the API of each version is compared. It does not compare what the source code does when executed.

External links
 JDiff homepage
 A sample report - resembles Javadoc reports

Documentation generators
Java development tools